This is a list of settlements in Cephalonia, Greece.

 Agia Effimia
 Agia Eirini
 Agia Thekla
 Agios Nikolaos
 Agkonas
 Antipata Erisou
 Arginia
 Argostoli
 Asos
 Atheras
 Chaliotata, Sami Σάμη. 2 km SE of Poulata.
 Chavdata
 Chavriata
 Chionata
 Damoulianata
 Davgata
 Digaleto
 Dilinata
 Divarata
 Faraklata
 Farsa
 Favatata
 Fiskardo
 Grizata
 Kaminarata
 Karavados
 Karavomylos
 Kardakata
 Karya
 Katogi
 Kerameies
 Komitata
 Kontogenada
 Kontogourata
 Kothreas
 Kourouklata
 Kouvalata
 Lakithra
 Lixouri
 Lourdata
 Makryotika
 Mantzavinata
 Markopoulo
 Mavrata
 Mesovounia
 Metaxata
 Monopolata
 Mousata
 Neochori
 Omala
 Nyfi
 Pastra
 Patrikata
 Peratata
 Pesada
 Petrikata
 Plagia
 Poros
 Poulata, Sami Σάμη.
 Rifi
 Sami
 Skala
 Skineas
 Soullaroi
 Spartia
 Svoronata
 Thinaia
 Touliata
 Troianata
 Valerianos
 Vary
 Vasilikades
 Villatoria
 Vlachata
 Xenopoulo
 Zola

See also
List of towns and villages in Greece

 
Cephalonia